Cardinal Vicar is a title commonly given to the vicar general of the Diocese of Rome for the portion of the diocese within Italy (i.e. excluding the portion within Vatican City). The official title, as given in the Annuario Pontificio, is Vicar General of His Holiness.

The bishop of Rome is responsible for the spiritual administration of this diocese, but because the bishop of Rome is the pope, with many other responsibilities, he appoints a cardinal vicar with ordinary power to assist in this task. Canon law requires all Catholic dioceses to have one or more vicars general, but the cardinal vicar functions more like a de facto diocesan bishop than do other vicars general. The holder has usually been a cardinal.

A similar position exists to administer the spiritual needs of the Vatican City, known as the vicar general for Vatican City or, more exactly, Vicar General of His Holiness for Vatican City.

Establishment

It seems certain that in the twelfth century vicars were named only when the pope absented himself for a long time from Rome or its neighbourhood. When he returned, the vicar's duties ceased. This may have lasted to the pontificate of Pope Innocent IV (1243–54); on the other hand it is certain that in the latter half of the thirteenth century the vicar continued to exercise the duties of his office even during the presence of the pope at Rome. Thus the nomination of a vicar on 28 April 1299, is dated from the Lateran. The office owes its full development to the removal of the Roman Curia to Southern France and its final settlement at Avignon. Since then the list of vicars is continuous.

The oldest commissions do not specify any period of duration; in the Bull of 16 June 1307, it is said for the first time that the office is held "at our good will". It is only in the sixteenth century that we meet with life-tenures; the exact year of this important modification remains yet to be fixed. Formerly the nomination was by Bull; when began the custom of nominating by Brief is difficult to determine. The oldest Bull of nomination known bears the date of 13 February 1264.

An immemorial custom of the Curia demands that all its officials shall be duly sworn in, and this was the case with the vicars. In all probability during the twelfth and thirteenth centuries such oaths were taken at the hands of the pope himself. Later the duty fell to the Apostolic Camera. The oath, whose text (though very much older) first appears in a document of 21 May 1427, greatly resembles, in its first part, the usual episcopal oath; while the latter part applies to the office in question. The oath is conceived in very general terms and lays but slight stress on the special duties of the vicar. The official named on 18 October 1412, as representative of the vicar was also sworn in, and before entering on his office was admonished to take, in presence of a specified cardinal, the usual oath of fidelity to the pope and of a faithful exercise of the office.

Authority
According to the oldest known decree of nomination, 13 February 1264, both Romans and foreigners were subject to the jurisdiction of the vicar. In this document, however, neither the special rights of the vicar nor the local extent of his authority are made known, but it is understood that the territory in question is the city of Rome. On 27 June 1288, the vicar received the rights of "visitation, correction and reformation in spiritual matters ..... of dedicating churches and reconciling cemeteries, consecrating altars, blessing, confirming, and ordaining suitable persons from the city". On 21 July 1296, Pope Boniface VIII added the authority to hear confessions and impose salutary penances. On 6 July 1202, the following variant is met with: "to reform the churches, clergy, and people of Rome itself", and the additional right to do other things pertaining to the office of vicar.

His jurisdiction over all monasteries is first vouched for 16 June 1207. The inclusion among these of monasteries, exempt and non-exempt and their inmates, without the walls of Rome, was the first step in the local extension of the vicar's jurisdiction. He was also empowered to confer vacant benefices in the city. For a considerable length of time the above-mentioned rights exhibit the fulness of the vicar's authority.

Special commissions, however, multiply in this period, bearing with them in each case a special extension or new application of authority. Under Pope Clement VI (1342–52) the territory of the vicar-general's jurisdiction was notably increased by the inclusion of the suburbs and the rural district about Rome. Until the time of Pope Benedict XIV (1740–58) this was the extent of the vicar's jurisdiction. By the "district of the city of Rome" was understood a distance of forty Italian miles from the city walls. Since, however, the territory of the suburbicarian sees lay partially within these limits, the vicar came to exercise a jurisdiction concurrent with that of the local bishop and cumulatively. This was a source of frequent conflicts, until 21 December 1744, when the local jurisdiction of the suburbicarian bishops was abolished by Benedict XIV, insofar as their territory fell within the above-mentioned limits.

In the course of time the vicar acquired not only the position and authority of a vicar-general, who has ordinary but delegated power, but the right of subdelegation, whereby he named a vicegerent, his representative not alone in pontifical ceremonies (as many maintain), but also in jurisdiction. For the rest, being already delegatus a principe he can canonically subdelegate.

By a Constitution of Clement VIII, 8 June 1592, the vicar's right to hold a visitation ordinary and extraordinary of churches, monasteries, clergy, and the people (dating from 16 June 1307) was withdrawn in favour of the Congregatio Visitationis Apostolicæ, newly founded, for the current affairs of the ordinary visitation. Henceforth this duty pertains to the vicarius urbis only insofar as he may be named president or member of this congregation, the prefect of which is the pope himself. The great "extraordinary" visitations, held generally at the beginning of each pontificate, were executed by a specially-appointed commission of cardinals and prelates, the presidency of which fell by custom to the vicar. The Congregation of the Visitation was quite independent of the vicar, being constituted by Apostolic authority.

In 1929, with the establishment of Vatican City, Pope Pius XII removed Vatican City State from the authority of the cardinal vicar. Pope John XXIII established that the offices of the vicarate would be located at the Lateran Palace. Pope John Paul II reorganized the vicarate with the Apostolic constitution Ecclesia in Urbe, to bring the structure of the vicarate more in line with the 1983 Code of Canon Law.

The authority of the vicar does not cease with the pope who appointed him. But should he die during a vacancy of the Holy See, the vicegerent assumed his functions as a quasi vicar capitular. Theoretically at least, the vicar may hold diocesan synods; he could also formerly grant a number of choir-benefices. Pope Leo XIII reserved this right in perpetuity to the pope.

Vicegerents

The first episcopal assistant of the vicar known is Angelus de Tineosis, Episcopus Viterbiensis, named 2 October 1321, as assistant to the Vicar Andreas, Episcopus Terracinensis. His position is not so well outlined in the documents that we can form a clear idea of his duties. It is significant that Angelus officiated as assistant even when the Vicar Andreas was in the city. On the other hand, the Vicar Franciscus Scaccani, Episcopus Nolanus, was allowed to choose an assistant for the business of the vicariate only in the case of his own absence from Rome. According to this document it was not for the pope but the vicar himself, though authorized thereto by the pope, who chose his own assistant and gave over to him all his authority or faculties, insofar as they were based on law or custom. This shows that the vicarius urbis was firmly established in the fulness of his office and externally recognized as such; certain consuetudinary rights had even at this date grown up and become accepted. We see from the Bullarium Magnum (II, 75) that on 18 October 1412, Pope John XXII nominated Petrus Saccus, a canon of St. Peter's, as locum tenens of the Vicar Franciscus, abbas monasterii S. Martini in Monte Cimino O.S.B., and himself conferred on this official all the faculties of the vicar. The new locum tenens was bidden to take the usual oath before the Apostolic Camera (see above). A similar case is that (1430) of Lucas de Ilpernis, another canon of St. Peter's. When Petrus Accolti, Bishop-elect of Ancona, was named vicarius urbis in 1505, he took over the jurisdiction, but the pontificalia or ceremonial rights were given to Franciscus Berthleay, Bishop of Mylopotamos, until the consecration of Accolti. A similar case is that of Andreas Jacobazzi, a canon of St. Peter's, named vicar in 1519, but not consecrated as Bishop of Lucera until 1520; the pontificalia were committed to Vincentius, Bishop of Ottochaz-Zengg.

The series of assistants to the vicar, now known as vices-gerentes (vicegerent), begins with 1560. Until the time of Pope Clement XI (1700) they were named by the vicar; since then the pope has appointed them by a special Brief. The vicesgerens is therefore not a representative (locum tenens) of the vicar, but a subordinate auxiliary bishop appointed for life, though removable at any time. His authority (faculties) relative to jurisdiction and orders is identical with that of the vicar; for its exercise, however, he depends on the latter, as is expressly stated in the Brief of his nomination. In particular, the vicar has committed to him the administration of the treasury of relics known as the Lisanotheca or relic-treasury of the vicariate, the censorship of books, and the permission to print. The censorship of books was entrusted to the vicar by a Bull of 4 May 1515 (in the Magnum Bullarium); this right, however, is now exercised by the vices-gerens subject to the Magister sacri palatii, to whose imprimatur he adds his own name without further examination of the book in question. The really responsible censor is therefore the Magister sacri palati, not the vicesgerens. Occasionally there have been two assistants of the vicar, to one of whom were committed all matters of jurisdiction, to the other the pontificalia and ordinations; the latter was known as suffragan of the vicar.

Organisation of the Vicariate of Rome

Ordinations
In this respect the duties of the vicar are of primary importance, since a multitude of ecclesiastics from all parts of the world pursue their studies at Rome and receive orders there on presentation of the required authorization of their respective bishops. For every order conferred at Rome there is a special examination conducted by a body of twenty-five learned ecclesiastics from the secular and the regular clergy, which operates in sections of three. Orders are regularly conferred on the days prescribed by ecclesiastical law and in the cathedral of the Bishop of Rome, i. e. in the Lateran Basilica; they may, however, be conferred on other days and in other churches or chapels. They are usually conferred either by the vicar himself or by the vicesgerens; by special delegation from the vicar, however, another bishop may occasionally ordain candidates. For the rights of the cardinals to ordain in their own churches (tituli, diaconia) see Cardinal. By a general pontifical indult any bishop resident in Rome may administer the Sacrament of Confirmation, it being still customary at Rome to confirm all children who seem in danger of death.

Religious orders
All matters concerning the monasteries of Rome and their inmates pertain to a special commission in the vicariate composed of about eight members and under the direction of the vicar.

Preaching
Strict regulations of Pope Pius X permit only those to preach in Rome who have been found worthy after a thorough examination, scientific and practical, before a special commission which issues to each successful candidate the proper authorization. A similar regulation exists for priests desirous of hearing confessions in the city.

Parochial clergy
The parochial clergy of Rome form a special corporation, under a Camerlengo chosen annually by themselves. Apart from the rights secured them by their statutes, insofar as approved by the pope, they are entirely subject to the vicar.

Court
Since the vicar is the ordinary judge of the Roman Curia and its territory, it follows that he has always had and now has his own court, or tribunal. Formerly it took cognizance of both civil and criminal matters, either alone or concurrently with other tribunals, whether the case pertained to voluntary or to contentious jurisdiction. This court no longer deals with criminal cases, though it still exists for certain matters provided for in the ecclesiastical law, the details of which may be seen in any of the larger manuals of canon law. The principal officials of the court of the vicariate are the above-mentioned vicegerents, the locum tenens civilia, the promotor fiscalis for cases of beatification and canonization, the promotor fiscalis for other ecclesiastical matters, chiefly monastic vows. In former times the auditor of the vicariate was a very busy person, being called on to formulate or to decide the various processes brought before the vicar; to-day the office is mostly an honorary one. Matrimonial cases are dealt with by two officials who form a special section of the vicariate

Secretariate
Among the minor officials of the vicar the most important are those who have charge of the secretariate, i. e. the secretary, his representative, two minutanti or clerks, and the aforesaid auditor of the vicar. The secretary is daily at his post and is authorized by subdelegation to decide or settle a number of minor matters of a regularly recurring nature; he also makes known the decisions of the vicar in more important matters; and is accessible to every one daily during a period of two hours. In view of a speedier administration corresponding to modern demands Pope Pius X has very much simplified the workings of the vicariate; some of its departments he suppressed, others he combined, so that now of its former fifteen sections and sub-sections only seven remain.

1912 reorganization
The organization of the Roman vicariate, as described above, rested largely on usage; it was not constructed as a compact whole at one single time. The most important ordinances respecting it were issued at various times during the course of the last two centuries, showing that for a long time the inadequacy of its organization, especially as regards the great length of time necessary for the settlement of matters brought before it, had been severely felt, more, however, by the subordinates of the vicariate than by its higher officials. It could not be said that its methods of business were in any way compatible with modern ideas as to efficient management. The lack of harmony was doubly evident after the entire central administration of the Church had been reformed by the Constitution Sapienti Consilio, of 29 June 1908. During the past various difficulties had stood in the way of a thorough reform of the Roman vicariate. Not the least of these was the lack of space in the former office of the vicariate. It was not until after the purchase of the Palazzo Mariscotti near San Francesco alle Stimmate, which was assigned to the cardinal vicar and his officials and arranged for their use, that Pius X was able to carry out his long cherished plan for a thorough reform of the Roman vicariate.

Pope Pius X published his new ordinances respecting the administration of his Diocese of Rome in the Apostolic Constitution Etsi nos in, of 1 January 1912, and the canon law entered into force, as provided in it, on 15 January 1912, the day it was promulgated in the Acta Apostolicae Sedis. Of the regulations for the period of transition, which were naturally necessary in so thorough a reorganization, only one need be mentioned. This is that the former vicegerent (vicesgerens, see below), whose office and title were to be suppressed, was permitted as a personal privilege to continue to bear the title as long as he was connected with any of the transactions of the vicariate.

The Curia Urbis or the Vicariate of the City of Rome was divided into four departments (officia), of which the second is again divided into four sections. The first department (officium) has under its care all the church services and the Apostolic visitation of the diocese. The second department watches over the behaviour of the clergy and the Christian people. Judicial matters are settled in the third department, and the fourth department is devoted to the economic administration of the entire vicariate. The head of all these bureaus is the cardinal who is the vicar-general of the pope in Rome. His office and the extent of his power are always the same and are permanent, so that they do not cease even when the Papal See is vacant. This fact distinguishes the cardinal vicar as he is called, for the designation is not an official title, from all other vicars-general in the world, and gives him his peculiar legal position. In the same way it is a noticeable exception that the four departments can carry on their customary business, even when the vicar is not able to supervise what is done on account of the conclave or of some other impediment. Even should the vicar die the work of the departments goes quietly on. Formerly this was not the case to so large a degree, as is shown by the deputation of 17 December 1876, on the death of Cardinal Vicar Patrizi.

The head of the first department is a commissary, of the second an assessor, of the third an auditor, and of the fourth a prefect. Their respective rank follows the order given above. Among the offices mentioned in the former article those of the vicegerent (vicesgerens), the locum tenens, the secretary, and the auditor in the earlier form were abolished. None of the four new presiding officers of the departments is permitted under any pretext whatever to interfere in the affairs of another, except in purely internal matters of administration.

First department
The canonical visitation of the Diocese of Rome is in the hands of a commission of cardinals. The president of the commission is the vicar, and its members by virtue of their office are prefects of the Congregation of the Council and of Religious Orders. The secretary of this official board is the commissary just mentioned. The first appointee as secretary and commissary was the former vicegerent (vicesgerens). The archives and compendiums of abstracts of the former Congregation of the Apostolic Visitation, which has been suppressed since 1908, belong to the new commission. Every five years, the next falling in 1916, a canonical visitation of Rome is to be held without any express papal command being issued before the visitation. Six paragraphs (12–17) regulate the details of the procedure to be observed in the visitation.

The treasury of relics (lipsanotheca), the archaeological commission, and the committee on church music are included in this department and are under the supervision of the vicar. A commission on ecclesiastical art has been established; its competence includes the erection of churches, their maintenance, restoration and adornment. The first department is obliged to keep an exact list of all the churches in Rome, in one of which is noted the object and peculiarities of each church.

Second department
The second department has four sections, the head of each of which is a secretary: the first section has to do with the clergy; the second, with the convents of women; the third with the schools, colleges and other institutions for education in the city; the fourth with the brotherhoods, unions, and social societies. All four sections are subordinate first to the vicar and next to the assessor. The powers of the first section are laid down in details in twelve ordinances. Mention should be made of the stringent rule that no clergyman, regardless of whether he belongs to the Roman clergy or to another diocese, can be called to an office or a benefice by anyone, even a cardinal, unless it has been previously established by a secret letter to the vicar that the vicariate has no objection to his appointment. This regulation puts an end finally to an old abuse of historic growth which in past times led to much that was disadvantageous.

This department has to keep a register of all members of the secular and regular clergy of the city, giving the name, age, residence, kind of employment and other personal notes. The vicar is aided in the settlement of all matters regarding the clergy by the examiners of the clergy, in the settlement of questions as to the transfer or deposition of parish priests by the consultors, in all questions as to offices and benefices by the general supervisory council, the deputies for the seminaries and the advisory council (commissio directiva). Detailed regulations are given as to the examiners of the clergy in paragraph 30, a to i. The second section of this department is charged with the supreme direction and supervision of the numerous convents for women; the details are regulated in seven paragraphs. Paragraphs 38–46 are concerned with the schools, colleges, and other educational institutions for the laity. The care of these is the duty of the third section. Its secretary must keep an exact list of all such institutions, of their teachers and principals, and exact statistics respecting the pupils. He must attend the meetings of the school board, keep its minutes, and must execute all the orders of the vicar or the supervisory council respecting these institutions. Paragraphs 47–57 regulate in detail the work of the fourth section, which has under its charge the brotherhoods, unions, and social societies. It consists of a council of six members with a secretary of its own.

Third department
All previously existing judicial bodies are suppressed and the pope has made the vicar the ordinary and sole judge in the first instance for all suits brought in the court of the Roman diocese. The vicar passes judgement only in those cases which he has expressly reserved for himself; in other cases his auditor acts as judge, forming with the vicar one and the same court. The auditor is regarded as the official of the curia of the Roman Diocese and tries the suits according to common law. The office and jurisdiction of the camerlengo of the Roman clergy have been suppressed and his faculties and jurisdiction have been transferred completely to the auditor, who is provided with a substitute. When according to common law a suit is to be decided not by a single judge but by a full bench, the auditor is then held to be the presiding judge, in case the vicar does not reserve the position of presiding officer to himself. The appointment of the associate judges belongs to the pope; for the individual case the vicar has the right to select the associate judges from those appointed by the pope. This ordinance is especially worth noticing. The other ordinances cannot here be discussed in detail.

Fourth department
The fourth department is directed by a prefect. It has charge of all the purely administrative affairs of the vicariate, its principal work being the care of finances; it has also charge of the purchase of supplies, as the formularies, supplies for the chancellery, etc. The organization effected offers nothing that requires any particular comment. The head of the department is called a prefect.

Order of business of the vicariate
The necessary changes being made, the essential ordinances of the Constitution Sapienti Consilio and the enacting ordinances afterwards issued for the congregations and curial authorities in regard to the manner in which business should be transacted also apply to the vicariate. It should be observed that a secret and a public archive have been established for the vicariate. The vicar is to submit to the pope for approval the rules respecting office hours and holidays. Of much importance is the closing formula of the Constitution which was drawn up in accordance with the new formulary of the Apostolic Chancellery. After the formulary has been tested for a time by practice it is to be published. It says: "Decernentes praesentes litteras firmas, validas et efficaces semper esse et fore, suosque plenarios et integros effectus sortiri et obtinere a die promulgationis in Commentario de Apostolicae Sedis actis".

A comparison with the earlier article shows that the reconstruction of the vicariate is not an organic continuation of the former condition but that an entirely new organization has been created. There is in this change an evident effort to organize the official bodies as servants of the public and to do this on the basis of the modern method of carrying on business, as it is found everywhere in countries that lead in civilization and in well-organized central boards of authorities. Formerly the administration was a cumbrous one, impeded by traditional obstacles; it may perhaps be said to have regarded itself as the primary object and the public which it should serve as of subordinate consideration. This state of things is now past, thanks to the energy of the reigning pope, which overcame all obstacles. Now, anyone who has business with the vicariate knows exactly to which department, which official, he must go in order to have the matter in question speedily settled. It is to be expected that in the course of time the third department owing to the test of practical working may undergo slight changes, as it is not probable that all ordinances will prove capable of permanent execution. The characteristics of the new organization are division of work and rigid separation of the judiciary from the executive administration, together with an ample supply of officials for the different departments. In the reorganization customs that had become historical were taken into consideration only insofar as they could be combined without difficulty with modern methods of business.

To inspire greater confidence in the newly created offices of the vicariate, the pope appointed in May 1912 a superior board of control, composed of three cardinals, whose duty it is to supervise the business affairs of the vicariate; Cardinals Lugari, Pompili and Van Rossum were the first to be named for this important and influential board and these nominations were received by the clergy of Rome with unanimous expressions of good will and gratification.

Reorganization
On 6 January 2023, Pope Francis reorganized the Vicariate with the apostolic constitution In Ecclesiarum Communione, effective 31 January, to increase collegiality and improve administration and address contemporary societal challenges. It defined the position of cardinal vicar as an auxiliary bishop to the Bishop of Rome and clarified the roles of Rome's auxiliary bishops. Francis gave himself a greater role as head of the episcopal council, that is, the collective body of the bishops of the Diocese. This replaced the 1998 apostolic constitution Ecclesia in Urbe.

List of Vicars General

The first vicarius in spiritualibus clearly vouched for is Bovo (Bobo) episcopus Tusculanus (Lavicanus) about 1106. Until 1260 the vicars were chosen from among the cardinals; the first vicar taken from among the bishops in the vicinity of Rome was the Dominican Thomas Fusconi de Berta, episcopus Senensis (Moroni, Eubel). This custom continued until the secret consistory of 29 November 1558, when Pope Paul IV decreed that in the future the vicars should be chosen from among the cardinals of episcopal dignity; it was then that arose the popular title of "cardinal-vicar", never used officially; the formal title was then Vicarius Urbis, and is now, under the Annuario Heading heading "Vicariato di Roma – Vicariatus Urbis", "Vicario Generale di Sua Santità".

Cardinal Vicars General (1198–1260)

Ottaviano dei Conti (1198–1207)
Pietro Gallocia (1207–1217)
Pietro Saxonis (1217–1227)
Romano Bonaventura (1227–1238)
Giacomo da Pecoraia (1238–1244)
Stefano Normandi (1244–1251)
Riccardo Annibaldi (1251–1260)

Bishop Vicar General (1260–1558)

Tommaso Fusconi di Berta (1260–1262)
Giovanni Colonna (1262–1264)
Tommaso da Lentini (1264–1267)
N.N. (1267–1272)
Aldobrandino Cavalcanti (1272–1280)
Latino Frangipani Malabranca (1280–1288)
Bartolomeo di Grosseto (1288–1290)
Giovanni di Iesi, first time (1290–1291)
Salvo di Recanati (1291–1295)
Giovanni di Iesi, second time (1295–1296)
Lamberto di Veglia (1296–1299)
Alemanno di Tiro e Oristano (1299–1301)
Ranuccio di Cagliari (1301–1302)
Nicola Alberti (1302–1303)
Giovanni di Osimo (1303–1303)
Giacomo di Sutri (1303–1307)
Guittone Farnese (1307–1309)
Isnardo Tacconi (1309–1313)
Ruggero da Casole (1313–1317)
Giovanni di Nepi (1317–1322)
Andrea di Terracina, first time (1322–1324)
Angelo Tignosi, first time (1324–1325)
Andrea di Terracina, second time (1325–1325)
Angelo Tignosi, second time (1325–1335)
Giovanni Pagnotta (1335–1341)
Nicola Zucci (1341–1343)
Raimondo di Rieti (1343–1348)
Ponzio di Orvieto (1348–1361)
Giovanni di Orvieto (1361–1365)
Pietro Boerio (1365–1369)
Giacomo di Muti (1369–1375)
Luca Gentili Ridolfucci (1375–1380)
Stefano Palosi (1380–1383)
Gabriele Gabrieli (1383–1389)
Lorenzo Corvini (1389–1392)
Giovanni di San Paolo fuori le Mura (1392–1394)
Francesco Scaccani (1394–1405)
Paolo di Francesco di Roma (1405–1411)
Francesco di San Martino di Viterbo (1411–1414)
Pietro Sacco (1414–1417)
Giacomo Isolani (1417–1421)
Sante di Tivoli (1421–1427)
Nicola Lazzaro di Guinigi (1427–1429)
Luca de Ilpinis (1429-16/04/1431)
Daniele Gari Scotti (1431–1431)
Gasparre di Diano (1431–1434)
Stefano di Volterra (1434–1435)
Genesio di Cagli (1435–1437)
Andrea di Osimo (1437–1444)
Giosuè Mormile (1441–1444)
Onofrio Francesco di Melfi (1444–1448)
Roberto Cavalcanti (1448–1449)
Berardo Eruli (1449–1458)
Francesco de Lignamine (1458–1461)
Giovanni Neroni (1461–1464)
Dominico Dominici (1464–1479)
Nicola Trevisano (1479–1485)
Leonardo di Albenga (1485–1486)
Giacomo Botta (1486–1494)
Giacomo Serra (1494–1501)
Pietro Gamboa (1501–1505)
Pietro Accolti (1505–1511)
Domenico Jacobazzi (1511–1520)
Andrea Jacobazzi (1520–1521)
Paolo Capizucchi (1521–1539)
Bartolomeo Guidiccioni (1539–1540)
Pomponio Cecci (1540–1542)
Filippo Archinto (1542–1554)
Ludovico Beccadelli (1554–1555)
Pietro di Lucera (1555–1555)
Virgilio Rosario (1555–1558)

Cardinal Vicars General (1558–present)

Virgilio Rosario (1558–1559)
Giacomo Savelli (1560–1587)
Girolamo Rusticucci (1588–1603)
Camillo Borghese (1603–1605), elected as Pope Paul V
Girolamo Pamphili (1605–1610)
Giovanni Garzia Millini (1610–1629)
Marzio Ginetti (1629–1671)
Paluzzo Paluzzi Altieri degli Albertoni (1671)
Gasparo Carpegna (1671–1714)
Niccolò Caracciolo (pro-vicar, 1715–1717)
Giandomenico Paracciani (1717–1721)
Fabrizio Paolucci (1721–1726)
Prospero Marefoschi (1726–1732)
Giovanni Guadagni, OCD (1732–1759)
Antonio Erba-Odescalchi (1759–1762)
Marcantonio Colonna (iuniore, 1762–1793)
Andrea Corsini (not to be confused with St. Andrea Corsini) (1793–1795)
Giulio Maria della Somaglia (1795–1818)
Lorenzo Litta (1818–1820)
Annibale della Genga (1820–1823), elected as Pope Leo XII
Carlo Odescalchi (1834–1838)
Giuseppe della Porta Rodiani (1838–1841)
Costantino Patrizi Naro (1841–1876)
Raffaele Monaco La Valletta (1876–1880)
Lucido Parocchi (1884–1899)
Domenico Jacobini (1899–1900)
Pietro Respighi (1900–1913)
Basilio Pompili (1913–1931)
Francesco Marchetti-Selvaggiani (1931–1951)
Clemente Micara (1951–1965)
Luigi Traglia (1965–1968)
Angelo Dell'Acqua (1968–1972)
Ugo Poletti (1973–1991)
Camillo Ruini (1991–2008)
Agostino Vallini (2008–2017)
Angelo De Donatis (2017–present)

Sources
A then complete but uncritical list of the vicarii in spiritualibus in urbe generales was published by Ponzetti (Rome, 1797); it was added to and improved by Moroni (Dizionario, XCIX).
From the manuscripts of Francesco Cancellieri in the Vatican Library new names were added by Crostarosa (Dei titoli della Chiesa romana, Rome, 1893). Eubel, by his own studies for the first volume of his "Hierarchia Catholica Medii Ævi", and with the aid of the manuscript notes of Giuseppe Garampi in the Vatican Archives, was enabled to present a new list substantially enlarged and improved (1200–1552). Many new discoveries of the undersigned have enabled him to draw up a critical list of the vicars and their representatives from 1100 to 1600. For the period before 1100 a fresh examination of all the original sources is necessary; for the present all names previous to that date must be held as uncertain.

See also
Suburbicarian Diocese of Ostia
Vicar General for Vatican City

Notes

References

Catholic ecclesiastical titles
Catholic Church in Italy